Armatosterna castelnaudi is a species of beetle in the family Cerambycidae. It was described by Thomson in 1865, originally under the genus Callimation. It is known from South Africa, Botswana, the Democratic Republic of the Congo, Burundi, Zimbabwe, and Gabon.

Subspecies
 Armatosterna castelnaudii castelnaudii (Thomson, 1865)
 Armatosterna castelnaudii crassicornis Téocchi, Jiroux & Sudre, 2004

References

Tragocephalini
Beetles described in 1865